Watch Your Back is the sixth studio album released by blues guitarist Guitar Shorty (David Kearney). The album was released on April 27, 2004 on CD by the label Alligator Records. It has been called a "welcome return for old fans and a perfect introduction for those new to Shorty's long career."

Track listing 
"Old School" (Jesse Harms) — 3:59
"Story of My Life" (Jesse Harms, Truitt) — 3:13
"I'm Gonna Leave You" (Truitt) — 5:44
"What She Don't Know" (Truitt) — 3:16
"I've Been Working" (Van Morrison) — 4:33
"Get Busy" (Jesse Harms) — 3:41
"Let My Guitar Do the Talking" (Jesse Harms, O'Keefe) — 4:50
"It Ain't the Fall That Kills You" (Jesse Harms) — 5:11
"A Little Less Conversation" (Davis, Strange) — 4:04
"Right Tool for the Job" (Truitt) — 3:44

Personnel 
Guitar Shorty — guitar, vocals
Sweet William Bouchard — bass
Electric Vic Johnson — guitar (rhythm)
Alvino Bennett — drums, percussion
Jesse Harms — piano, producer, engineer, mixing

Production:
Dan Monick — photography
Brian Brinkerhoff — producer
Dan Stout — mastering
Marc Lipkin — liner notes
Kevin Niemiec — design

Reception 

Allmusic calls the album Shorty's "most fiery and gutsy album yet, a tough and uncompromising slab of steely playing, no-nonsense singing, and solid songs." Reviewer Hal Horowitz says that he "rips into these ten tracks sounding like he's young, hungry, and ready to explode."

Charts
Album - Billboard

References

2004 albums
Guitar Shorty albums
Alligator Records albums